WOW Worship: Orange is a compilation CD of Christian Music in the WOW Worship series. It reached No. 65 on the Billboard 200 chart.  WOW Worship: Orange was certified as platinum in sales in 2001 by the Recording Industry Association of America (RIAA).  The album was certified as gold in Canada in 2001 by the Canadian Recording Industry Association (CRIA).

WOW Worship: Orange was known as WOW Worship, Vol. 2 when first released. Albums in this series were not known by their cover colors until the release of WOW Worship: Green in 2001.

Track listing

Disc One (Orange)
"Did You Feel/Mountains Tremble" – Delirious?
 recorded at West Park Studios in Littlehampton, England
"Light the Fire Again" – Brian Doerksen
 recorded in Brentwood, Tennessee
"Rock of Ages" – Praise Band
 recorded at Calvary Chapel Costa Mesa 
"Hungry" (Falling On My Knees) – Kathryn Scott
 recorded in Hull, England 
"Better Is One Day" – Charlie Hall
 recorded at West Park Studios in Littlehampton, England 
"In That Day" – Praise Band
"We Want To See Jesus Lifted High" – Noel Richards
 recorded in Colorado Springs, Colorado
"Worship You" – Jami Smith
"In the Secret" – Sonicflood
 recorded in Nashville, Tennessee
"I Walk By Faith" – Chris Falson (sung by Praise Band) 
 recorded in Calvary Chapel in Costa Mesa, California 
"Redeemer Savior Friend" – Darrell Evans and Chris Springer (sung by Dave Brooks) 
 recorded in Brentwood, Tennessee 
"Jesus, Lover of My Soul" – Darlene Zschech
 recorded at Hills Centre in Castle Hill, Australia
"You Are God" – Scott Underwood
 recorded at Vineyard Church of Anaheim in Anaheim, California 
"We Will Dance" – David Ruis
 recorded in Brentwood, Tennessee 
"I Will Not Forget You" – Praise Band

Disc Two (Cyan)
Victory Chant – Joseph Vogels (sung by Bob Fitts)
 recorded at Calvary Chapel Costa Mesa
I Will Celebrate – The Maranatha! Singers
Celebrate Jesus – The Alleluia Singers (featuring Don Moen) 
 recorded in Colorado Springs, Colorado
I Believe in Jesus – Keith Matten
 recorded in Brentwood, Tennessee 
Holy and Anointed One –  Randy Butler
He Is Able –  Praise Band
 recorded at Calvary Chapel Costa Mesa
Above All – Paul Baloche (sung by Lenny LeBlanc) 
 recorded at Harvest Church in Riverside, California
I See the Lord –  Chris Falson
 recorded in Capistrano Beach, Dana Point, California
Awesome God – Praise Band
 recorded at Calvary Chapel Costa Mesa
God Is Good All the Time – Don Moen 
 recorded in Colorado Springs, Colorado
Shine Jesus Shine – Graham Kendrick
 recorded at ICC Studios in Eastbourne, England
Jesus Is Alive – Ron Kenoly
 recorded at Jubilee Christian Center in San Jose, California
God Will Make A Way – Don Moen
 recorded at North Heights Lutheran Church in Arden Hills, Minnesota
As the Deer –  Martin J. Nystrom (sung by The Maranatha! Singers)
 recorded at Calvary Chapel Costa Mesa
Glorify Thy Name –  Donna Adkins (sung by The Maranatha! Singers)
 recorded in Brentwood, Tennessee
When I Look Into Your Holiness – Wayne and Cathy Perrin (sung by Kent Henry)
 recorded in Mobile, Alabama
There Is None Like You – Lenny LeBlanc
 recorded in Colorado Springs, Colorado
Holy Ground – Geron Davis
 recorded in Colorado Springs, Colorado

References

External links
 [ Review] at Allmusic.  Retrieved March 21, 2007.

2000 compilation albums
WOW series albums